Tongai Mafidi Mnangagwa (born 10 February 1978) is a Zimbabwean politician who currently serves as the Member of Parliament for the Harare South constituency. He is the nephew of President Emmerson Mnangagwa and is the sole ZANU–PF MP representing Harare Province.

Early life and education 
Mnangagwa was born on 10 February 1978 in Zambia. He moved to Zimbabwe as a young child, attending Haig Park Primary School in Harare. He did his O Levels at Gokomere High School, a Catholic boarding school in Masvingo Province, before completing his secondary education at Prince Edward School, a government high school in Harare. He then attended Harare Polytechnic, where he earned a certificate in marketing. He is currently pursuing a Bachelor of science honors in development studies at the Zimbabwe Open University

Political career 
Mnangagwa joined ZANU–PF at age 18, and became the youth chairperson for the party's Tangwena District at age 20. Later, he moved to Harare South and joined the party's Leopold Takawira District as a committee member, later rising to become the political commissar of the main board.

In 2018, Mnangagwa was ZANU–PF's candidate for the House of Assembly in the 2018, running against over a dozen other candidates. On election day, Mnangagwa won with a 39% plurality, defeating the two MDC Alliance candidates, incumbent Shadreck Mashayamombe, and Tichaona Saurombe, who received 24% and 12%, respectively, as well as the MDC–T candidate, Desmond Jambaya, who earned 6% of the vote. He was sworn into Parliament on 5 September 2018.

Personal life 
Mnangagwa is married and lives in the Mabelreign suburb of Harare. He has six children with his wife, Gwendolyn Mnangagwa.

Electoral history

See also 
 List of members of the 9th Parliament of Zimbabwe

References 

1978 births
Living people
20th-century Zimbabwean politicians
21st-century Zimbabwean politicians
Harare Polytechnic alumni
Members of the National Assembly of Zimbabwe
People from Harare
Zambian emigrants to Zimbabwe
ZANU–PF politicians
Zimbabwean businesspeople